Ernest Terpiłowski (born 14 September 2001) is a Polish professional footballer who plays as an attacking midfielder for Widzew Łódź.

Career statistics

Club

Notes

References

2001 births
Living people
People from Brzeg Dolny
Polish footballers
Association football midfielders
Poland youth international footballers
Ekstraklasa players
I liga players
II liga players
III liga players
Bruk-Bet Termalica Nieciecza players
Górnik Polkowice players
Widzew Łódź players